Dasyscopa is a genus of moths of the family Crambidae.

Species
Dasyscopa axeli Nuss, 1998
Dasyscopa barbipennis (Hampson, 1897)
Dasyscopa homogenes Meyrick, 1894

References

Scopariinae
Crambidae genera
Taxa named by Edward Meyrick